Traditionalism is the adherence to traditional beliefs or practices. It may also refer to:

Religion 
 Traditional religion, a religion or belief associated with a particular ethnic group
 Traditionalism (19th-century Catholicism), a 19th–century theological current
 Traditionalist Catholicism, a modern movement that rejects the reforms of the Second Vatican Council (1962–1965)
 Traditionalist Christianity, also known as Conservative Christianity
 Traditionalism (Islam), an early Islamic movement advocating reliance on the prophetic traditions (hadith)
 Traditionalist theology (Islam), a modern movement that rejects rationalistic theology (kalam)
 Traditionalism (Islam in Indonesia), an Indonesian Islamic movement upholding vernacular and syncretic traditions
 Traditionalist School (perennialism), a school of religious interpretation concerned with the perceived demise of Western knowledge

Politics 
 Traditionalist conservatism, a school concerned about traditional values, practical knowledge and spontaneous natural order
 Traditionalist conservatism in the United States, a post-World War II American political philosophy
 Carlism, a 19th–20th century Spanish political movement related to Traditionalism
 Traditionalism (Spain), a Spanish political doctrine

Other uses 
 Traditionalist School (architecture), a movement in early 20th-century Dutch architecture
 Traditionalism Revisited, a 1957 album by American jazz musician Bob Brookmeyer

See also 
 Radical Traditionalism (disambiguation)
 Tradition (disambiguation)
 Trad (disambiguation)